Maurice Blomme (29 October 1926 – 11 April 1980) was a Belgian professional road bicycle racer. He competed in the team pursuit event at the 1948 Summer Olympics. In 1950, Blomme was the winner of the 12th stage of the 1950 Tour de France.

Major results

1947
 military road race champion
1949
Aaigem
Zottegem
Stadem
Ooigem
1950
Kampioenschap van Vlaanderen
Omloop van het Houtland
Roeselare
Wingene
Zottegem
Tour de France:
Winner stage 12
Ronde van West-Vlaanderen
Handzame
Houtem
Omloop der drie Provinciën
Grand Prix des Nations
1951
Ardooie
Halle–Ingooigem
Houtem
Sint-Andries
Zottegem
Hooglede
Boezinge
Komen
Kortrijk
Wingene
1952
Berlare
Hooglede
Kruishoutem
Soignies
Zingem
Eke
1953
Houthulst
Stene
1954
Mandel-Leie-Schelde
GP stad Vilvoorde
Driedaagse van West-Vlaanderen
Omloop van het Houtland
Lessines
1955
Douai
Le Bizet
Oostende
Omloop van het Westen
Kachtem
Aarschot
1956
Oostrozebeke
Soignies
1957
Tielt

References

External links

Official Tour de France results for Maurice Blomme

1926 births
1980 deaths
Cyclists from West Flanders
Belgian male cyclists
Belgian Tour de France stage winners
Olympic cyclists of Belgium
Cyclists at the 1948 Summer Olympics
People from Staden
20th-century Belgian people